Centro Tampa (previously known as Centro Mi Diario) is a weekly Spanish-language tabloid published in Tampa, Florida, by Times Publishing Company, a company that also owns The Tampa Bay Times and tbt*.

CENTRO Tampa began publication on October 21, 2005. Currently, it is the largest Spanish-language newspaper in Tampa Bay with a circulation of more than 50,000. Since 2007, the publication has been audited by the Audit Bureau of Circulations (ABC).

References

External links
 

Tampa, Florida
Mass media in the Tampa Bay area
2005 establishments in Florida